Formicilla is a genus of antlike flower beetles in the  family Anthicidae. There are at least three described species in Formicilla, found in Central and North America.

Species
These three species belong to the genus Formicilla:
 Formicilla coniceps Pic, 1937
 Formicilla leporina LaFerté, 1849
 Formicilla munda LeConte, 1852

References

Further reading

 

 

Anthicidae